Michael Strickler McBath (born May 29, 1946 in Woodbury, New Jersey) is an American businessman, former professional American football player, and part-owner of the Orlando Predators of the Arena Football League. He is a former president of the NFL Retired Players Association.

McBath is currently a senior vice president with Union Bank of Switzerland (formerly Paine Webber).

AFL ownership
In 1991, McBath co-founded the Orlando Predators, one of the Arena Football League's most successful franchises. McBath and his partners sold the team in 1997, but he returned as a part-owner in 2004.

Football
McBath played five seasons (1968–1972) in the National Football League with the Buffalo Bills. McBath was released midway through the 1972 after suffering a sciatic nerve injury. He signed briefly with the Washington Redskins before moving to World Football League to play a season with the Florida Blazers.

McBath was a two-way player at Penn State, playing offensive and defensive line. He was inducted into the Gloucester County Sports Hall of Fame in 1992 for his accomplishments while at Woodbury Junior-Senior High School in Woodbury, New Jersey.

Charity
McBath is involved with Orlando-based "The City of Legends," an organization which provides benefits and services for retired professional athletes in exchange for participation in local charity events.

External links
 Orlando Predators History, orlandopredators.com, November 16, 2006.
 Bills Alumni Spotlight: Mike McBath, Jim Gehman, buffalobills.com, February 9, 2004.
 The City of Legends website

References

1946 births
Living people
American football defensive ends
American football defensive tackles
Players of American football from New Jersey
Players of American football from Pennsylvania
Arena Football League executives
Buffalo Bills players
Florida Blazers players
American investment bankers
Penn State Nittany Lions football players
Sportspeople from Woodbury, New Jersey
Washington Redskins players
Woodbury Junior-Senior High School alumni